5,6-MDO-MiPT, or 5,6-methylenedioxy-N-methyl-N-isopropyltryptamine, is a lesser-known psychedelic drug.  It is the 5,6-methylenedioxy analog of MiPT. 5,6-MDO-MiPT was first synthesized by Alexander Shulgin. In his book TiHKAL (Tryptamines I Have Known and Loved), 5,6-MDO-MiPT produces slight paresthesia at low doses.  Very little data exists about the pharmacological properties, metabolism, and toxicity of 5,6-MDO-MiPT.

See also 

 Tryptamine
 MiPT
 Psychedelics, dissociatives and deliriants

External links 
 5,6-MDO-MiPT Entry in TIHKAL
 5,6-MDO-MIPT Entry in TiHKAL • info

Psychedelic tryptamines